Bridge Creek is a  tributary of the John Day River in the U.S. state of Oregon.

Bridge Creek is subject to occasional flash floods, which have affected Mitchell as well as rural areas nearby. Surging water along the creek, which flows parallel to Main Street in Mitchell, caused great damage in 1884 and 1904. A third flood occurred on July 13, 1956, shortly after an intense thunderstorm in the Ochoco Mountains. Minutes after the thunderstorm, a sudden surge of water destroyed or heavily damaged 20 buildings in the city and several bridges over Bridge Creek. Total damage from the flood, which also caused extensive damage to crops and roads, was $709,000.

See also 
 List of rivers of Oregon

References

Rivers of Oregon
Rivers of Wheeler County, Oregon